The Takeover Directive 2004/25/EC is an EU Directive dealing with European company law's treatment of mergers and acquisitions. It concerns the standards takeover bidders must comply with in how long a bid stays open to, who they offer to, and the information companies must give to the public about the bid. The most controversial provision, which eventually was made optional, was the requirement of the board of directors of a target company to be neutral in the bid process.

Content
art 3, general principles including the equal treatment principle for shareholders
art 4, the requirement on member states for an authority to monitor takeovers (e.g. in the UK, this is the Takeover Panel)
art 5, the requirement to make a mandatory bid for everyone's shares, and giving an equitable price
art 6, minimum requirements for information on a bid being made
art 7, member states can set between 2 and 10 weeks as a limit for the period for acceptance of a bid
art 8, bids should be made public without material errors or misrepresentations
art 9, board neutrality rule, no frustrating action may be taken without specific post-bid shareholder approval. Directors may, however, still seek out another more favourable bidder (or ‘white knight’) or complete measures begun pre-bid that fall into a company's ordinary course of business.
art 9(2) board can search for a more favourable suitor
art 9(5) board should give its views on a bid
art 11, non compulsory opt in rules Gives breakthrough provisions to defeat, (a) share structures making minority shareholders have disproportionate voting rights (b) limitations on share ownership (c) restrictions on share transfers in the company's articles or a share holder agreement.
art 12, bnr is optional in art 9(2), and neither is art 11.
art 20, directive provisions will be reviewed in 2011.

See also
UK company law

Notes

References
PL Davies, E-P Schuster and E Van de Walle de Ghelcke, 'The Takeover Directive as a Protectionist Tool?' (2010) EGCI Working Paper
D Kershaw, ‘The Illusion of Importance: Reconsidering the UK’s Takeover Defence Prohibition’ (2007) 56 International & Comparative Law Quarterly 267

Mergers and acquisitions